The Sam Houston State Bearkats baseball team is a varsity intercollegiate athletic team of Sam Houston State University in Huntsville, Texas, United States. The team is a member of the Western Athletic Conference, an athletic conference in Division I of the National Collegiate Athletic Association (NCAA). The team plays its home games at Don Sanders Stadium.

History
The first Sam Houston baseball team was fielded in 1906 and was the university's first collegiate athletic team.  After disbandment following their 1926 campaign, the Bearkats returned in 1947 as a member of the Lone Star Conference. The modern era for the Bearkats baseball team began in 1949, as the Sam Houston athletic department does not include any statistics prior to the season in the program's record books. Since 1949, however, Sam Houston State baseball has been one of the most productive sports out of all the university athletic programs. The Bearkats boast an overall 1732-1134-7 (.604) WLT record from 1949 through the 2012 season. The Bearkats claim one national title from the NAIA World Series in 1963.

The Malone years (1949–1956)
To begin the modern era, Hayden "Hap" Malone, former graduate and professor of Physical Education at SHSTC was hired as the head baseball coach in 1949. As a NAIA independent in baseball, Hap Malone's Bearkats saw mixed results in his first 6 years as the Bearkats head coach. The program was quite successful from 1949 through 1950 as the Bearkats posted a combined 24–14 record in those two seasons (15–5 and 19–9 respectively). The next two seasons saw two losing records, (11–13 and 11–14). The 1953 and 1954 seasons were both winning seasons, with the Bearkats posting a 20 win record in 1954. However, the roller coaster ride was not over and the Kats once again fell into mediocrity in 1955–56. After the 1956 season resulting in 10–18 record, their lowest win total to date, Coach Malone was relieved of his duties. Hap Malone was inducted into Sam Houston Hall of Honor in 1971.

The Benge supremacy (1957–1968)
To right the ship left by Hap Malone, Sam Houston hired Ray Benge as the new head coach of the Bearkats. Ray Benge formerly pitched for Sam Houston in the early twenties before being drafted by the Phillies and playing 12 years in the Major Leagues. Benge proved to be the cure to ail all of the Bearkats woes as his teams never saw a losing record. Benge took the Bearkats to six straight NAIA Baseball World Series appearances including one national championship win in 1963 over Grambling. He finished with a 237–102 record and was inducted into SHSU's Hall of Honor with Hap Malone in 1971.

The Bob Britt years (1969–1975)
Despite being the university's shortest tenured coach (excluding current head coach David Pierce), Bob Britt continued the success of the baseball squad following Benge's departure. Like his predecessor, Britt also never head a losing season. He also coached the Bearkats to two NAIA Area Playoff berths in 1969 and 1970, and three NAIA World Series appearances in 1972, 1974, and in 1975 which all were top 3 finishes with the latter two seasons being national runner-up years. Britt also coached Sam Houston to its first two 40-win seasons in 1974 and 1975. He retired from coaching following the 1975 season, but continued to teach Physical Education as a professor at Sam Houston until 1995. Britt was inducted into Sam Houston Hall of Honor in 1979.

The John Skeeters era (1976–2002)
Coach John Skeeters was Sam Houston longest tenured baseball coach with over 25 years as the Bearkats' head coach. He picked up right were Britt left off as the Skeeters led Bearkats to winning seasons in his first 16 years as head coach. During this stretch, the Bearkats saw post-season action in 9 different years, including 4 NAIA Area Playoff berths from 1979 through 1982.

In 1984, the Bearkats moved into NCAA Division II and stayed here for three years as an independent and later as a member of the Gulf Star Conference. In Division II, the Bearkats were selected to the regional playoffs in all three years. The Bearkats also were the Gulf Star Champions in 1985 and 1986.

In 1987, the Gulf Star Conference moved up into Division I. In addition to winning the Gulf Star Conference championship in 1987, Sam Houston State also earned a berth into its first Division I regional thanks to a 44–18–1 record, its highest win total to date.

The Bearkats moved to the Southland Conference in 1988 and while they struggled in conference play (11–10 record), they still managed to earn a winning record, finishing 32–25. Despite a rough first season in the Southland, Sam Houston quickly acclimated to its new home and won the 1989 conference championship. In addition to the championship, Sam Houston earned a berth to the NCAA regionals. Following the 1989 season, the Bearkats would not win another conference championship again until Coach Pierce took over in 2012, and would only go to the NCAA regionals once more under Coach Skeeters (1996).

Following four straight losing seasons from 1999–2002, Skeeters decided to resign as head coach of the Sam Houston Bearkats. His overall mark of 860 wins and 628 losses will cement his legacy as the longest tenured coach for years to come.

Chris Rupp's Bearkats (2003–2006)
Chris Rupp was hired following Skeeters' resignation prior to the 2003 season. In his four years as head coach, Rupp's teams failed to finish with a winning season. In 2006, he resigned as the head coach and finished with an overall record of 86–123 record.

The Mark Johnson years (2007–2012)
Mark Johnson, former Texas A&M coaching legend and member of the American Baseball Coaches Association and Texas Baseball halls of fame, took over as head coach a little more than a month after Rupp's resignation and immediately began working on improving the baseball team. Johnson brought in two full-time assistants to his coaching staff, a luxury the previous two Bearkats coaches did not have. There was seemingly no rebuilding stage for the Bearkats, as Johnson led Sam Houston to a 40–24 record his first year as coach, only a year removed from a 23–31 season under Chris Rupp. Since Johnson joined the Bearkat staff as head coach, the team saw post season action in 4 of his 5 seasons at Sam Houston, including 3 NCAA regional appearances.

Under David Pierce (2012–2014)

2012
David Pierce, who joined the staff in 2011 from Rice, continued where Johnson left off, as the 2012 baseball team saw its best ever Regional finish (2nd) and coached the Bearkats to its first outright league title in 23 years. The 2012 Bearkats lost in the regional title game to Arkansas, who would eventually go on to become a Super Regional Champion to earn a berth in the College World Series. Coach Pierce would later win both the Southland Conference Coach of the Year and the ABCA Coach of the Year at the end of the season.

2013
The start of the 2013 season came with very high expectations for Coach Pierce and the Bearkats. Coming into the season, the Kats received votes in the NCBWA poll and was picked to repeat as Southland Conference champions by the Coaches' and SID polls. After a disappointing 3–4 start, the Bearkats would go on to beat then #22 ranked Texas in Austin, and then #19 ranked Rice in Houston to right the ship. Following these big games, however, Sam Houston would lose back to back series' against UCONN and Dallas Baptist. Following these games, the Bearkats went 13–8 in their next 21, including wins over #17 Rice and #19 Houston, but lost a major home series to Oral Roberts which dropped SHSU's Ratings Percentage Index (RPI) far enough down to put an at-large bid for the 2013 regionals in jeopardy. Sam Houston accepted the challenge and worked its way back to finish the season going 13–1 after the Oral Roberts series, earning the #27 spot in the Collegiate Baseball poll. On May 17, 2013, Sam Houston clinched its second straight outright Southland Conference Title with a 4–0 shutout of Central Arkansas. Following the regular season, Coach Pierce would win the Conference Coach of the Year award yet again, and would earn an at-large bid to the NCAA Tournament Baton Rouge Regional after failing to win the Southland Conference Tournament.  In the NCAA tournament, the Bearkats defeated Louisiana-Lafayette in the first game 4–2 behind Luke Plucheck's 3 RBIs. In the winner's bracket, Sam Houston faced regional host and #1 overall LSU Tigers. With the help of a 5 run first inning the Bearkats led the top ranked Tigers 5–4 until the 8th inning. Sam Houston could not upset the Tigers, losing in heartbreaking fashion 8–5. In the last day of the Baton Rouge regional, Sam Houston faced the Ragin' Cajuns for the second time in three days. Sam Houston would jump out to a 3–0 lead, but errors would send the Bearkats home early, as they lost the final game of the season 5–7.

SHSU career coaching records

Year-by-year results

Source: Houston State University Baseball Record Book

Post season appearances

<small>Source: Houston State Record Book: Post Season Results</small>

Notable players
Many of Sam Houston baseball players earned various awards and honors, including 95 All-Conference players, 16 All-Americans, and 7 conference award winners. Film director Richard Linklater also played baseball at Sam Houston.

All-Americans
The Bearkats have produced 16 All-Americans across three different divisions (NAIA, NCAA D-I, and NCAA D-II). Four of these players earned the honor in multiple years.

 NAIA All-America
Alton Arnold, 1960 hm, 1961 1t, 1962 hm
Fred Beene, 1963 1t, 1964 1t
Doyle Campbell, 1975 hm
Jud Chamblee, 1981 hm
Albert Choate, 1965 2t
Floyd Ciruti, 1972 1t
Richard Dyer, 1961 hm
Jimmy Dodd, 1963 2t, 1965 1t
David Woolley, 19741t

 NCAA D-II All-America
Richard Johnson, 1983 3t, 1985 1t
Bryan McDonald, 1986 1t
Terry Pirtle, 1986 1t

 NCAA D-I All-America
Kelly Eddlemon, 1999 1t
Douglas Moulder, 1999 2t
Luke Prihoda, 2007 1t
Bobby Verbick, 2007 1t
Todd Sebek, 2008 3t
Nick Zaleski, 2009 hm
Heath Donica, 2017 3t1t denotes 1st Team selection, 2t denotes 2nd Team selection, 3t denotes 3rd Team selection, and hm denotes Honorable MentionPost-season awards
Sam Houston has had 9 players earn end of the season awards, such as Pitcher of the Year, Player of the Year, and Newcomer of the Year. These awards were handed out by the Gulf Star Conference from 1985 through 1987 and by the Southland Conference from 1988 through the present.Conference honors''

 Player of the Year
Richard Johnson, 1985
Terry Pirtle, 1986 and 1987
Anthony Azar, 2014

 Hitter of the Year
Colton Cowser, 2019

 Pitcher of the Year
Kenneth Garza, 1989
Steve Prihoda, 1994
Greg Kubes, 1997
Luke Prihoda, 2007
Heath Donica, 2017

 Clay Gould Coach of the Year
John Skeeters, 1989
David Pierce, 2013 & 2014
Matt Deggs, 2016

 Newcomer of the Year
Isaias Garcia, 2005

 Relief Pitcher of the Year
Dakota Mills, 2018

 Freshman of the Year
Hayden Wesneski, 2017

In 2001 the Bearkats set a new tournament record for runs scored in a game with 22.  Third baseman Douglas Moulder and right fielder Josh Harrison both contributed with 2 home runs and 7 R.B.I.s each, also tying each other for the tournament record. Harrison also stole 3 bases in the game. For Moulder, it was his 9th multi-homer game of the season< a school record. 
 
Harrison and Moulder are also tied for the longest home run at Bearkats Stadium. In 1998 Harrison blasted a shot 437 ft. The following year, Moulder launched a ball the same distance in his second hit as a Bearkat.

Seven players have also been selected as the Southland Conference Tournament Most Valuable Player.

Brent Bubela, 1996
Douglas Moulder, 1999
Luke Prihoda, 2007
Bobby Verbick, 2008
Matt Shelton, 2009
Heath Donica, 2016
Robie Rojas, 2017

Source: Houston State Record Book: Postseason Honors

Players in Major League Baseball
As of the 2021 Major League Baseball season, Sam Houston has had 16 former members go on to play Major League Baseball:

See also
List of NCAA Division I baseball programs

References

External links